Confalone is an Italian surname. Notable people with the surname include:

Marina Confalone (born 1951), Italian actress
Simone Confalone (born 1974), Italian footballer

Italian-language surnames